On 23 December 2006 and 3 January 2007, Tunisian security forces engaged in clashes with members of a group with connections to the Islamist terror group Salafist Group for Preaching and Combat (GSPC) in the towns of Soliman and Hammam-Lif south of the capital Tunis, killing more than a dozen people.

Clashes
On 23 December, two Islamists were killed and two arrested in a shootout with police in the town of Hammam-Lif south of Tunis.

On 3 January, at least two members of Tunisian security forces and twelve Islamists were killed, and fifteen arrested in a clash in a forested area near Soliman.

Among those killed was the leader of the group, Lassaad Sassi, a former Tunisian policeman who had spent time in Afghanistan and headed a terror network based in Milan, Italy. Sassi's group had reportedly established training camps in the mountains in Djebel Ressas and Boukornine south of the Tunisian capital.

According to French daily Le Parisien at least 60 people were killed in the clashes. It was later revealed that the Islamists had been in possession of blueprints of foreign embassies as possible targets. The attacks were the most serious by Islamists in Tunisia since the Ghriba synagogue bombing in 2002.

References

Violence in Tunisia
Mass shootings in Africa
Conflicts in 2006
Conflicts in 2007
Attacks in Africa in 2006
Attacks in Africa in 2007
Terrorist incidents in Tunisia
Islamic terrorism in Tunisia
2006 in Tunisia
2007 in Tunisia
2006 murders in Tunisia
2007 murders in Tunisia
2006 mass shootings in Africa
2007 mass shootings in Africa
Terrorist incidents in Tunisia in 2006
Terrorist incidents in Tunisia in 2007